Namasthe Bali is a 2015 Malayalam language film produced by Minhal Mohammed Ali under the banner of Minhal Productions. The film stars Roma Asrani in the lead role  along with Aju Varghese, Devan, Neena Kurup, Balu Varghese and Noby Marcose. The film is directed by K V Bijoy. The music is composed by Gopi Sundar. The screenplay is based on a story written by Dhinil Babu and Devadas. The film was a comeback for Roma to the Malayalam film field after a three year gap. The film is also considered as a genre similar to the Bollywood film Queen based on the storyline.

Plot 
The film is the story of Annamma and Chandy. Both of them from are from very affluent families in Kottayam and Annamma is a nurse by profession. Meanwhile, Chandy feels that Annama is not that modern in her attitude and incites feelings to runaway to escape from the marriage. Chandy elopes after informing his mother that he will be in Bali. On hearing this news Annama sets out to find Chandy in Bali. On reaching Bali, she gets completely lost. She finds some Malayali friends who help her to transform into a party girl from a shy malayalee girl. The film portrays the beauty of Bali and is completely shot in Bali. The story also has a photographer who helps Annamma enjoy her new life in Bali. Later, she finds Chandy and makes him regret his choice of leaving to Bali to escape from the marriage by showing him the transformation she has acquired after coming to Bali.

Cast 

 Roma Asrani as Annamma Anto
 Aju Varghese as Chandy Kariya/Chadikunju
 Balu Varghese as Tony
 Devan as Anto Chakkalakyal
 Master Gaurav as Joji Anto
 Noby Marcose as George
 Sunil Sukhada as Kariya Kovathinkal
 Arun V. Narayan as Micle
 Manoj K. Jayan as Sunny
 Neena Kurup as Gracy Anto
 Mini Arun as Clara Kariya
 Kottayam Pradeep 
 Sangeetha vijayan as George's Wife

Songs 
The music is composed by Gopi Sundar

 "Pichakappo" –  Gopi Sunder
 "Tenni Tudichu Vannen" – Gopi Sunder
 "Mutholam Azhakilu Chiriyulla Penne" – Anna Catherine and team

References

External links
 

2015 films
2010s Malayalam-language films
Films about women in India
Films scored by Gopi Sundar